The Lost Cause of the Confederacy (or simply Lost Cause) is an American pseudohistorical negationist mythology that claims the cause of the Confederate States during the American Civil War was just, heroic, and not centered on slavery. First enunciated in 1866, it has continued to influence racism, gender roles, and religious attitudes in the Southern United States to the present day.

Lost Cause proponents typically praise the traditional culture of honor and chivalry of the antebellum South. They argue that enslaved people were treated well and deny that their condition was the central cause of the war, contrary to statements made by Confederate leaders, such as in the Cornerstone Speech. Instead, they frame the war as a defense of states' rights, and as necessary to protect their agrarian economy against supposed Northern aggression. The Union victory is thus explained as the result of its greater size and industrial wealth, while the Confederate side is portrayed as having greater morality and military skill. Modern historians overwhelmingly disagree with these characterizations, noting that the central cause of the war was slavery.

There were two intense periods of Lost Cause activity: the first was around the turn of the 20th century, when efforts were made to preserve the memories of dying Confederate veterans, and the second was during the civil rights movement of the 1950s and 1960s, in reaction to growing public support for racial equality. Through actions such as building prominent Confederate monuments and writing history textbooks, Lost Cause organizations (including the United Daughters of the Confederacy and Sons of Confederate Veterans) sought to ensure Southern whites would know what they called the "true" narrative of the Civil War, and therefore continue to support white supremacist policies such as Jim Crow laws. In that regard, white supremacy is a central feature of the Lost Cause narrative.

Origins

Though the idea of the Lost Cause has more than one origin, it consists mainly of an argument that slavery was not the primary cause, or not a cause at all, of the Civil War. Such a narrative denies or minimizes the statements of the seceding states, each of which issued a statement explaining its decision to secede, and the wartime writings and speeches of Confederate leaders, such as CSA Vice President Alexander Stephens's Cornerstone Speech, instead favoring the leaders' more moderate postwar views. The Lost Cause argument stresses the idea of secession as a defense against a Northern threat to a Southern way of life, and says that the threat violated the states' rights guaranteed by the Constitution. It asserts that any state had the right to secede, a point strongly denied by the North. The Lost Cause portrays the South as more adherent to Christian values than the allegedly greedy North. It portrays slavery as more benevolent than cruel, alleging that it taught Christianity and "civilization". Stories of happy slaves are often used as propaganda in an effort to defend slavery; the United Daughters of the Confederacy had a "Faithful Slave Memorial Committee" and erected the Heyward Shepherd monument in Harpers Ferry, West Virginia. These stories would be used to explain slavery to Northerners. The Lost Cause portrays slave owners being kind to their slaves. In explaining Confederate defeat, an assertion is made that the main factor was not qualitative inferiority in leadership or fighting ability but the massive quantitative superiority of the Yankee industrial machine. At the peak of troop strength in 1863, Union soldiers outnumbered Confederate soldiers by over two to one, and the Union had three times the bank deposits of the Confederacy.

History

19th century

The defeat of the Confederacy devastated many white Southerners economically, emotionally, and psychologically. Before the war, many proudly believed that their rich military tradition would avail them in the forthcoming conflict. Many sought consolation in attributing their loss to factors beyond their control, such as physical size and overwhelming brute force.

The University of Virginia professor Gary W. Gallagher wrote:

The Lost Cause became a key part of the reconciliation process between North and South around 1900 and formed the basis of many white Southerners' postbellum war commemorations. The United Daughters of the Confederacy, a major organization, has been associated with the Lost Cause for over a century.

Yale University history professor Rollin G. Osterweis summarizes the content that pervaded "Lost Cause" writings:

Louisiana State University history professor Gaines Foster wrote in 2013:

The term "Lost Cause" first appeared in the title of an 1866 book by the Virginian author and journalist Edward A. Pollard, The Lost Cause: A New Southern History of the War of the Confederates. He promoted many of the aforementioned themes of the Lost Cause. In particular, he dismissed the role of slavery in starting the war and understated the cruelty of American slavery, even promoting it as a way of improving the lives of Africans:

However, it was the articles written by General Jubal A. Early in the 1870s for the Southern Historical Society that firmly established the Lost Cause as a long-lasting literary and cultural phenomenon. The 1881 publication of The Rise and Fall of the Confederate Government by ex-Confederate President Jefferson Davis, a two-volume defense of the Southern cause, provided another important text in the history of the Lost Cause. Davis blamed the enemy for "whatever of bloodshed, of devastation, or shock to republican government has resulted from the war". He charged that the Yankees fought "with a ferocity that disregarded all the laws of civilized warfare". The book remained in print and often served to justify the Southern position and to distance it from slavery.

Early's original inspiration for his views may have come from Confederate General Robert E. Lee. When Lee published his farewell order to the Army of Northern Virginia, he consoled his soldiers by speaking of the "overwhelming resources and numbers" that the Confederate army had fought against. In a letter to Early, Lee requested information about enemy strengths from May 1864 to April 1865, the period in which his army was engaged against Lieutenant General Ulysses S. Grant (the Overland Campaign and the Siege of Petersburg). Lee wrote, "My only object is to transmit, if possible, the truth to posterity, and do justice to our brave Soldiers." In another letter, Lee wanted all "statistics as regards numbers, destruction of private property by the Federal troops, &c." because he intended to demonstrate the discrepancy in strength between the two armies and believed it would "be difficult to get the world to understand the odds against which we fought". Referring to newspaper accounts that accused him of culpability in the loss, he wrote, "I have not thought proper to notice, or even to correct misrepresentations of my words & acts. We shall have to be patient, & suffer for awhile at least.... At present the public mind is not prepared to receive the truth." All of the themes were made prominent by Early and the Lost Cause writers in the 19th century and continued to play an important role throughout the 20th.

In a November 1868 report, U.S. Army general George Henry Thomas, a Virginian who had fought for the Union in the war, noted efforts made by former Confederates to paint the Confederacy in a positive light:

Memorial associations such as the United Confederate Veterans, the United Daughters of the Confederacy, and Ladies Memorial Associations integrated Lost-Cause themes to help white Confederate-sympathizing Southerners cope with the many changes during the era, most significantly Reconstruction. The institutions have lasted to the present and descendants of Southern soldiers continue to attend their meetings.

In 1879, John McElroy published Andersonville: A Story of Rebel Military Prisons, which strongly criticized the Confederate treatment of prisoners and implied in the preface that the mythology of the Confederacy was well established and that criticism of the otherwise-lionized Confederates was met with disdain:

In 1907, Hunter Holmes McGuire, physician of Confederate general Stonewall Jackson, published in a book papers sponsored by the Grand Camp of Confederate Veterans of Virginia, supporting the Lost Cause tenets that "slavery [was] not the cause of the war" and that "the North [was] the aggressor in bringing on the war". The book quickly sold out and required a second edition.

Reunification of North and South

American historian Alan T. Nolan states that the Lost Cause "facilitated the reunification of the North and the South". He quotes historian Gaines M. Foster, who wrote that "signs of respect from former foes and northern publishers made acceptance of reunion easier. By the mid-eighties, most southerners had decided to build a future within a reunited nation. A few remained irreconcilable, but their influence in southern society declined rapidly." Nolan mentioned a second aspect: "The reunion was exclusively a white man's phenomenon and the price of the reunion was the sacrifice of the African Americans."

The historian Caroline Janney stated:

The Yale historian David W. Blight wrote:

In exploring the literature of reconciliation, the historian William Tynes Cowa wrote, "The cult of the Lost Cause was part of a larger cultural project: the reconciliation of North and South after the Civil War". He identified a typical image in postwar fiction: a materialistic, rich Yankee man marrying an impoverished spiritual Southern bride as a symbol of happy national reunion. Examining films and visual art, Gallagher identified the theme of "white people North and South [who] extol the American virtues both sides manifested during the war, to exalt the restored nation that emerged from the conflict, and to mute the role of African Americans".

Historian and journalist Bruce Catton argued that the myth or legend helped achieve national reconciliation between North and South. He concluded that  "the legend of the lost cause has served the entire country very well", and he went on to say:

New South

Historians have stated that the "Lost Cause" theme helped white Southerners adjust to their new status and move forward into what became known as "the New South". Hillyer states that the Confederate Memorial Literary Society (CMLS), founded by elite white women in Richmond, Virginia, in the 1890s, exemplifies that solution. The CMLS founded the Confederate Museum to document and to defend the Confederate cause and to recall the antebellum mores that the new South's business ethos was thought to be displacing. By focusing on military sacrifice, rather than on grievances regarding the North, the Confederate Museum aided the process of sectional reconciliation, according to Hillyer. By depicting slavery as benevolent, the museum's exhibits reinforced the notion that Jim Crow laws were a proper solution to the racial tensions that had escalated during Reconstruction. Lastly, by glorifying the common soldier and portraying the South as "solid", the museum promoted acceptance of industrial capitalism. Thus the Confederate Museum both critiqued and eased the economic transformations of the New South and enabled Richmond to reconcile its memory of the past with its hopes for the future and to leave the past behind as it developed new industrial and financial roles.

The historian Jacquelyn Dowd Hall stated that the Lost-Cause theme was fully developed around 1900 in a mood not of despair but of triumphalism for the New South. Much was left out of the Lost Cause:

Statues of Moses Jacob Ezekiel
The Virginian Moses Jacob Ezekiel, the most prominent Confederate expatriate, was the only sculptor to have seen action during the Civil War. From his studio in Rome, where a Confederate flag hung proudly, he created a series of statues of Confederate "heroes" which both celebrated the Lost Cause in which he was a "true believer", and set a highly visible model for Confederate monument-erecting in the early 20th century.
 
According to journalist Lara Moehlman, "Ezekiel's work is integral to this sympathetic view of the Civil War". His Confederate statues included:

 Virginia Mourning Her Dead (1903), for which Ezekiel declined payment, although another source says that he charged half of his usual fee. The original is at his alma mater, the Virginia Military Institute, honoring the 10 cadets (students) who died, one (Thomas G. Jefferson, the president's great-great-nephew) in Ezekiel's arms, at the Battle of New Market. It stands adjacent to the graves of six of the cadets. In 1914 Ezekiel gave a 3/4-size replica to the Museum of the Confederacy (since 2014 part of the American Civil War Museum) in his native Richmond.
 Statue of Stonewall Jackson (1910), West Virginia State Capitol, Charleston, West Virginia. A replica is at the Virginia Military Institute.
 Southern, also called The Lookout (1910), Confederate Cemetery, Johnson's Island, Ohio. Commissioned by the United Daughters of the Confederacy; Ezekiel asked only to be reimbursed the cost of the casting.
 Tyler Confederate Memorial Gateway (1913), City Cemetery, Hickman, Kentucky. Commissioned by the United Daughters of the Confederacy.
 Statue of John Warwick Daniel (c. 1913), Lynchburg, Virginia.
 Confederate Memorial (1914), Arlington National Cemetery, Arlington, Virginia, which Ezekiel called New South. According to Moehlman, "no monument exemplifies the Lost Cause narrative better than Ezekiel's Confederate Memorial in Arlington, where the woman representing the South appears to be protecting the black figures below". Ezekiel included "faithful slaves" because he wanted to undermine what he called the "lies" told about the South and slavery in Uncle Tom's Cabin, and wished to rewrite history "correctly" (his word) to depict black slaves' support for the Confederate cause. According to his descendant Judith Ezekiel, who has headed a group of his descendants calling for its removal, "This statue was a very, very deliberate part of revisionist history of racist America". According to historian Gabriel Reich, "the statue functions as propaganda for the Lost Cause.… It couldn't be worse."

Kali Holloway, director of the Make It Right Project, devoted to the removal of Confederate monuments, has said that:

Works of Thomas Dixon Jr.
No writer did more to establish the Lost Cause than Thomas Dixon Jr. (1864–1946), a Southern lecturer, novelist, playwright, filmmaker, and Baptist minister.

Dixon, a North Carolinian, has been described as

Dixon predicted a "race war" if current trends continued unchecked that he believed white people would surely win, having "3,000 years of civilization in their favor". He also considered efforts to educate and civilize African Americans futile, even dangerous, and said that an African American was "all right" as a slave or laborer "but as an educated man he is a monstrosity". In the short term, Dixon saw white racial prejudice as "self preservation", and he worked to propagate a pro-Southern view of the recent Reconstruction period and spread it nationwide. He decried portrayals of Southerners as cruel and villainous in popular works such as Uncle Tom's Cabin (1852), seeking to counteract these portrayals with his own work.

He was a noted lecturer, often getting many more invitations to speak than he was capable of accepting. Moreover, he regularly drew very large crowds, larger than any other Protestant preacher in the United States at the time, and newspapers frequently reported on his sermons and addresses.
He resigned his minister's job so as to devote himself to lecturing full-time and supported his family that way. He had an immense following, and "his name had become a household word." In a typical review of the time, his talk was "decidedly entertaining and instructive.... There were great beds of solid thought, and timely instruction at the bottom".

Between 1899 and 1903, he was heard by more than 5,000,000 people; his play The Clansman was seen by over 4,000,000. He was commonly referred to as the best lecturer in the country. He enjoyed a "handsome income" from lectures and royalties on his novels, especially from his share of The Birth of a Nation. He bought a "steam yacht" and named it Dixie.

After seeing a theatrical version of Uncle Tom's Cabin, "he became obsessed with writing a trilogy of novels about the Reconstruction period." The trilogy comprised The Leopard's Spots. A Romance of the White Man's Burden—1865–1900 (1902), The Clansman: A Historical Romance of the Ku Klux Klan (1905), and The Traitor: A Story of the Fall of the Invisible Empire (1907). "Each of his trilogy novels had developed that black-and-white battle through rape/lynching scenarios that are always represented as prefiguring total racewar, should elite white men fail to resolve the nation's 'Negro Problem'." Dixon also wrote a novel about Abraham LincolnThe Southerner (1913), "the story of what Davis called 'the real Lincoln'"another, The Man in Grey (1921), on Robert E. Lee, and one on Jefferson Davis, The Victim (1914).

Dixon's most popular novels were The Leopard's Spots and The Clansman. Their influential spin-off, The Birth of a Nation movie (1915), was the first film shown in the White House and repeated the next day to the entire Supreme Court, 38 Senators, and the Secretary of the Navy.

From the 20th century to the present

The basic assumptions of the Lost Cause have proved durable for many in the modern South. The Lost Cause tenets frequently emerge during controversies surrounding public display of the Confederate flag and various state flags. The historian John Coski noted that the Sons of Confederate Veterans (SCV), the "most visible, active, and effective defender of the flag", "carried forward into the twenty-first century, virtually unchanged, the Lost Cause historical interpretations and ideological vision formulated at the turn of the twentieth". Coski wrote concerning "the flag wars of the late twentieth century":

The Confederate States used several flags during its existence from 1861 to 1865. Since the end of the American Civil War, the personal and official use of Confederate flags and flags derived from them has continued under considerable controversy. The second state flag of Mississippi, adopted in 1894 after the state's so-called "Redemption" and relinquished in 2020 during the George Floyd protests, included the Confederate battle flag. The city flag of Trenton, Georgia, which incorporates the Confederate battle flag, was adopted in 2001 as a protest against the Georgia General Assembly voting to significantly reduce the size of the Confederate battle flag on their state flag.  The city flag of Trenton greatly resembles the former state flag of Georgia.

On March 23, 2015, a Confederate-flag-related case reached the Supreme Court of the United States. Walker v. Texas Division, Sons of Confederate Veterans centered on whether or not the state of Texas could deny a request by the SCV for vanity license plates that incorporated a Confederate battle flag. The Court heard the case on March 23, 2015. On June 18, 2015, the Supreme Court, in a 5–4 vote, held that Texas was entitled to reject the SCV proposal.

In October 2015, outrage erupted online following the discovery of a Texan school's geography textbook, which described slaves as "immigrants" and "workers". The publisher, McGraw-Hill, announced that it would change the wording.

Religious dimension
Charles Wilson argues that many white Southerners, most of whom were conservative and pious evangelical Protestants, sought reasons for the Confederacy's defeat in religion. They felt that the Confederacy's defeat in the war was God's punishment for their sins and motivated by this belief, they increasingly turned to religion as their source of solace. The postwar era saw the birth of a regional "civil religion" which was heavily laden with symbolism and ritual; clergymen were this new religion's primary celebrants. Wilson says that the ministers constructed

On both a cultural and religious level, white southerners tried to defend what their defeat in 1865 made impossible for them to defend on a political level. The Lost Cause, the South's defeat in a holy war, left southerners to face guilt, doubt, and the triumph of evil and they faced them by forming what C. Vann Woodward called a uniquely Southern sense of the tragedy of history.

Poole stated that in fighting to defeat the Republican Reconstruction government in South Carolina in 1876, white conservative Democrats portrayed the Lost Cause scenario through "Hampton Days" celebrations and shouted, "Hampton or Hell!" They staged the contest between Reconstruction opponent and Democratic candidate Wade Hampton and incumbent Governor Daniel H. Chamberlain as a religious struggle between good and evil and called for "redemption". Indeed, throughout the South, the Democrats who overthrew Reconstruction were frequently called "Redeemers", echoing Christian theology.

Gender roles

Among writers on the Lost Cause, gender roles were a contested domain. Men typically honored the role which women played during the war by noting their total loyalty to the cause. Women, however, developed a much different approach to the cause by emphasizing female activism, initiative, and leadership. They explained that when all of the men left, the women took command, found substitute foods, rediscovered their old traditional skills with the spinning wheel when factory cloth became unavailable, and ran all of the farm or plantation operations. They faced apparent danger without having men to perform the traditional role of being their protectors.

The popularization of the Lost Cause interpretation and the erection of monuments was primarily the work of Southern women, the center of which was the United Daughters of the Confederacy (UDC).

The duty of memorializing the Confederate dead was a major activity for Southerners who were devoted to the Lost Cause, and chapters of the UDC played a central role in performing it. The UDC was especially influential across the South in the early 20th century, where its main role was to preserve and uphold the memory of Confederate veterans, especially the husbands, sons, fathers, and brothers who died in the war. Its long-term impact was to promote the Lost Cause image of the antebellum plantation South as an idealized society which was crushed by the forces of Yankee modernization, which also undermined traditional gender roles. In Missouri, a border state, the UDC was active in setting up its own system of memorials.

The Southern states set up their own pension systems for veterans and their dependents, especially for widows, since none of them was eligible to receive pensions under the federal pension system. The pensions were designed to honor the Lost Cause and reduce the severe poverty which was prevalent in the region. Male applicants for pensions had to demonstrate their continued loyalty to the "lost cause". Female applicants for pensions were rejected if their moral reputations were in question.

In Natchez, Mississippi, the local newspapers and veterans played a role in the maintenance of the Lost Cause. However, elite white women were central in establishing memorials such as the Civil War Monument which was dedicated on Memorial Day 1890. The Lost Cause enabled women noncombatants to lay a claim to the central event in their redefinition of Southern history.

The UDC was quite prominent but not at all unique in its appeal to upscale white Southern women. "The number of women's clubs devoted to filiopietism and history was staggering," stated historian W. Fitzhugh Brundage. He noted two typical club women in Texas and Mississippi who between them belonged to the United Daughters of the Confederacy, the Daughters of the American Revolution, the Association for the Preservation of Virginia Antiquities, the Daughters of the Pilgrims, the Daughters of the War of 1812, the Daughters of Colonial Governors, and the Daughters of the Founders and Patriots of America, the Order of the First Families of Virginia, and the Colonial Dames of America as well as a few other historically-oriented societies. Comparable men, on the other hand, were much less interested in belonging to historical organizations; instead, they devoted themselves to secret fraternal societies and emphasized athletic, political, and financial exploits in order to prove their manhood. Brundage notes that after women's suffrage came in 1920, the historical role of the women's organizations eroded.

In their heyday in the first two decades of the 20th century, Brundage concluded:

These women architects of whites' historical memory, by both explaining and mystifying the historical roots of white supremacy and elite power in the South, performed a conspicuous civic function at a time of heightened concern about the perpetuation of social and political hierarchies. Although denied the franchise, organized white women nevertheless played a dominant role in crafting the historical memory that would inform and undergird southern politics and public life.

Tenets

Tenets of the Lost Cause movement include:
 Just as states had chosen to join the federal union, they could also choose to withdraw.
 Defense of states' rights, rather than the preservation of chattel slavery, was the primary cause that led eleven Southern states to secede from the Union, thus precipitating the War.
 Secession was a justifiable and constitutional response to Northern cultural and economic aggression against the superior, chivalric Southern way of life, which included slavery. The South was fighting for its independence. Many still want it.
 The North was not attacking the South out of a pure, though misguided motive: to end slavery. Its motives were economic and venal.
 Slavery was not only a benign institution but a "positive good". It was not based on economic greed, and slaves were generally happy and loyal to their kind masters (see: Heyward Shepherd). Slavery was good for blacks and whites alike, a symbiosis of races which were inherently unequal by nature. The lives of enslaved blacks were much better than they would be in Africa, or as free blacks in the North, where there were numerous anti-black riots. (Blacks were perceived as foreigners, immigrants taking jobs away from whites by working for less, and also as dangerously sexual.) It was not characterized by racism, rape, harsh working conditions, brutality, whipping, forced separation of families, and humiliation.
 Allgood identifies a Southern aristocratic chivalric ideal, typically called "the Southern Cavalier ideal", in the Lost Cause. It especially appeared in studies of Confederate partisans who fought behind Union lines, such as Nathan Bedford Forrest, Turner Ashby, John Singleton Mosby, and John Hunt Morgan. Writers stressed how they embodied courage in the face of heavy odds, as well as horsemanship, manhood, and martial spirit.
 Confederate generals such as Robert E. Lee, Albert Sidney Johnston, and Stonewall Jackson represented the virtues of Southern nobility and fought bravely and humanely. On the other hand, most Northern generals were characterized by brutality and bloodlust, subjecting the Southern civilian population to depredations like Sherman's March to the Sea and Philip Sheridan's burning of the Shenandoah Valley in the Valley Campaigns of 1864. Union General Ulysses S. Grant is often portrayed as an alcoholic.
 Losses on the battlefield were inevitable, given the North's superiority in resources and manpower. Battlefield losses were also sometimes the result of betrayal and incompetence on the part of certain subordinates of General Lee, such as General James Longstreet, who was reviled for doubting Lee at Gettysburg.
 The Lost Cause focuses mainly on Lee and the Eastern Theater of operations, in northern Virginia, Maryland, and Pennsylvania. It usually takes Gettysburg as the turning point of the war, ignoring the Union victories in Tennessee and Mississippi, and that nothing could stop the Union army's humiliating advance through Georgia, South Carolina, and North Carolina, ending with the Army of Northern Virginia's surrender at Appomattox.
 General Sherman destroyed property out of meanness. Burning Columbia, South Carolina, which had been a hotbed of secession, served no military purpose. It was intended only to humiliate and impoverish.
 Giving the vote to the newly freed slaves could only lead to political and social chaos. They were incapable of voting intelligently and were easily bribed or misled. Reconstruction was a disaster, only benefitting greedy Northern interlopers (scalawags). It took great effort by chivalrous Southern gentlemen to reestablish law and order through white dominance.
 The order and customs of Southern society were in accordance with Christian virtue and God's will, given the inherent moral weakness of mankind.

Symbols

Confederate generals

The most powerful images and symbols of the Lost Cause were Robert E. Lee, Albert Sidney Johnston, and Pickett's Charge. David Ulbrich wrote, "Already revered during the war, Robert E. Lee acquired a divine mystique within Southern culture after it. Remembered as a leader whose soldiers would loyally follow him into every fight no matter how desperate, Lee emerged from the conflict to become an icon of the Lost Cause and the ideal of the antebellum Southern gentleman, an honorable and pious man who selflessly served Virginia and the Confederacy. Lee's tactical brilliance at Second Bull Run and Chancellorsville took on legendary status, and despite his accepting full responsibility for the defeat at Gettysburg, Lee remained largely infallible for Southerners and was spared criticism even from historians until recent times."

In terms of Lee's subordinates, the key villain in Jubal Early's view was General Longstreet. Although Lee took all responsibility for the defeats, particularly the one at Gettysburg, Early's writings place the Confederate defeat at Gettysburg squarely on Longstreet's shoulders by accusing him of failing to attack at dawn on July 2, 1863, as instructed by Lee. In fact, however, Lee issued no such order and never expressed dissatisfaction with the second-day actions of his "Old War Horse". Because Gettysburg was perceived as the "high tide of the Confederacy", the loss there was seen to have led to the failure of the entire war to achieve independence for the South, the blame for which was hung on Longstreet's disinclination to attack. These charges stuck because Longstreet was already disparaged by many high-profile Southerners due to his reputation as a "scalawag", caused by postwar endorsement of and cooperation with his close friend and in-law, President Grant. Furthermore, Longstreet advised Southerners to co-operate with Reconstruction (to control the black vote) and he also joined the Republican Party and accepted a federal position.

Grant, in rejecting the Lost Cause arguments, said in an 1878 interview that he rejected the notion that the South had simply been overwhelmed by numbers. Grant wrote, "This is the way public opinion was made during the war and this is the way history is made now. We never overwhelmed the South.... What we won from the South we won by hard fighting." Grant further noted that when comparing resources, the "4,000,000 of negroes" who "kept the farms, protected the families, supported the armies, and were really a reserve force" were not treated as a southern asset.

"War of Northern Aggression"

One essential element of the Lost Cause movement was that the act of secession itself had been legitimate; otherwise, all of the Confederacy's leading figures would have become traitors to the United States. To legitimize the Confederacy's rebellion, Lost Cause intellectuals challenged the legitimacy of the federal government and the actions of Abraham Lincoln as president. That was exemplified in "Force or Consent as the Basis of American Government" by Mary Scrugham in which she presented frivolous arguments against the legality of Lincoln's presidency. They include his receiving a minority and unmentioned plurality of the popular vote in the 1860 election and the false assertion that he made his position on slavery ambiguous. The accusations, though thoroughly refuted, gave rise to the belief that the North initiated the Civil War, making a designation of "The War of Northern Aggression" possible as one of the names of the American Civil War.

Thomas Dixon Jr.'s novels

The Leopard's Spots

On the title page, Dixon cited Jeremiah 13:23: "Can the Ethiopian change his color, or the Leopard his spots?" He argued that just as the leopard cannot change his spots, the Negro cannot change his nature. The novel aimed to reinforce the superiority of the "Anglo-Saxon" race and advocate either for white dominance of black people or for the separation of the two races. According to historian and Dixon biographer Richard Allen Cook, "the Negro, according to Dixon, is a brute, not a citizen: a child of a degenerate race brought from Africa."  Dixon expounded the views in The Times of Philadelphia while he discussed the novel in 1902: "The negro is a human donkey. You can train him, but you can't make of him a horse." Dixon described the "towering figure of the freed negro" as "growing more and more ominous, until its menace overshadows the poverty, the hunger, the sorrows and the devastation of the South, throwing the blight of its shadow over future generations, a veritable black death for the land and its people." Using characters from Uncle Tom's Cabin, he shows the "happy slave" who is now, free and manipulated by carpetbaggers, unproductive and disrespectful, and he believed that freedmen constantly pursued sexual relations with white women. In Dixon's work, the heroic Ku Klux Klan protects American women. "It is emphatically a man's book," said Dixon to The Times.

The novel, which "blazes with oratorial fireworks", "attracted attention as soon as it came from the press", and more than 100,000 copies were quickly sold. "Sales eventually passed the million mark; numerous foreign translations of the work appeared; and Dixon's fame was international."

The Clansman

In The Clansman, the best known of the three novels, Dixon similarly claimed, "I have sought to preserve in this romance both the letter and the spirit of this remarkable period.... The Clansman develops the true story of the 'Ku Klux Klan Conspiracy', which overturned the Reconstruction regime."

"Lincoln is pictured as a kind, sympathetic man who is trying bravely to sustain his policies despite the pressures upon him to have a more vindictive attitude toward the Southern states." Reconstruction was an attempt by Augustus Stoneman, a thinly-veiled reference to US Representative Thaddeus Stevens of Pennsylvania, "the greatest and vilest man who ever trod the halls of the American Congress", to ensure that the Republican Party would stay in power by securing the Southern black vote. Stoneman's hatred for US President Andrew Johnson stems from Johnson's refusal to disenfranchise Southern whites. Stoneman's anger towards former slaveholders is intensified after the assassination of Abraham Lincoln, and Stoneman vows revenge on the South. His programs strip away the land owned by whites and give it to former slaves, as with the traditional idea of "forty acres and a mule". Men claiming to represent the government confiscate the material wealth of the South and destroy plantation-owning families. Finally, the former slaves are taught that they are superior to their former owners and should rise against them. These alleged injustices were the impetus for the creation of the Ku Klux Klan. "Mr. Dixon's purpose here is to show that the original formers of the Ku Klux Klan were modern knights errant, taking the only means at hand to right wrongs." Dixon's father belonged to the Klan, and his maternal uncle and boyhood idol, Col. Leroy McAfee, to whom The Clansman is dedicated, was a regional leader or, in the words of the dedication, "Grand Titan of the invisible Empire of the Ku Klux Klan".

The depiction of the Klan's burning of crosses, as shown in the illustrations of the first edition, is an innovation of Dixon. It had not previously been used by the Klan, but was later taken up by them.

"In Dixon's passionate prose, the book also treats at considerable length the poverty, shame, and degradation suffered by the Southerners at the hands of the Negroes and unscrupulous Northeners." Martial law is declared, US troops are sent in, as they were during Reconstruction. "The victory of the South was complete when the Klan defeats the federal troups throughout the state."

To publicize his views further, Dixon rewrote The Clansman as a play. Like the novel, it was a great commercial success; there were multiple touring companies presenting the play simultaneously in different cities. Sometimes, it was banned. Birth of a Nation is actually based on the play, which was unpublished until 2007, rather than directly on the novel.

The Birth of a Nation
Another prominent and influential popularizer of the Lost Cause perspective was D. W. Griffith's highly-successful The Birth of a Nation (1915), which was based on Dixon's novel. Noting that Dixon and Griffith collaborated on Birth of a Nation, Blight wrote:

Dixon's vicious version of the idea that blacks had caused the Civil War by their very presence, and that Northern radicalism during Reconstruction failed to understand that freedom had ushered blacks as a race into barbarism, neatly framed the story of the rise of heroic vigilantism in the South. Reluctantly, Klansmen—white men—had to take the law into their own hands in order to save Southern white womanhood from the sexual brutality of black men. Dixon's vision captured the attitude of thousands and forged in story form a collective memory of how the war may have been lost but Reconstruction was won—by the South and a reconciled nation. Riding as masked cavalry, the Klan stopped corrupt government, prevented the anarchy of 'Negro rule' and most of all, saved white supremacy.

In both The Clansman and the film, the Klan is portrayed as continuing the noble traditions of the antebellum South and the heroic Confederate soldier by defending Southern culture in general and Southern womanhood in particular against rape and depredations at the hands of the freedmen and Yankee carpetbaggers during Reconstruction. Dixon's narrative was so readily adopted that the film has been credited with the revival of the Klan in the 1910s and 1920s. The second Klan, which Dixon denounced, reached a peak membership of 2-5 million members. The film's legacy is widereaching in the history of American racism, and even the now-iconic cross burnings of the KKK were based on Dixon's novel and the film made of it. The first KKK did not burn crosses, which was originally a Scottish tradition, "Crann Tara", designed to gather clans for war.

Later literature and films
The romanticization of the Lost Cause is captured in film, such as The Birth of a Nation, Gone With the Wind, Song of the South, and Tennessee Johnsonthe latter of which the San Francisco Chronicle called "the height of Southern mythmaking". Gods and Generals reportedly lionizes Jackson and Lee. CNN reported that these films "recast the antebellum South as a moonlight and magnolia paradise of happy slaves, affectionate slave owners and villainous Yankees".

Post-1920s literature
In his novels about the Sartoris family, William Faulkner referenced those who supported the Lost Cause ideal but suggested that the ideal itself was misguided and out of date.

The Confederate Veteran, a monthly magazine published in Nashville, Tennessee, from 1893 to 1932, made its publisher, Sumner Archibald Cunningham, a leader of the Lost Cause movement.

Gone with the Wind
The Lost Cause view reached tens of millions of Americans in the best-selling 1936 novel Gone with the Wind by Margaret Mitchell and the Oscar-winning 1939 film based on it. Helen Taylor wrote:

Gone with the Wind has almost certainly done its ideological work. It has sealed in popular imaginations a fascinated nostalgia for the glamorous southern plantation house and ordered hierarchical society in which slaves are 'family,' and there is a mystical bond between the landowner and the rich soil those slaves work for him. It has spoken eloquently—albeit from an elitist perspective—of the grand themes (war, love, death, conflicts of race, class, gender, and generation) that have crossed continents and cultures.

David W. Blight wrote:
From this combination of Lost Cause voices, a reunited America arose pure, guiltless, and assured that the deep conflicts in its past had been imposed upon it by otherworldly forces. The side that lost was especially assured that its cause was true and good. One of the ideas the reconciliationist Lost Cause instilled deeply into the national culture is that even when Americans lose, they win. Such was the message, the indomitable spirit, that Margaret Mitchell infused into her character Scarlett O'Hara in Gone With the Wind ...

Southerners were portrayed as noble, heroic figures, living in a doomed romantic society that rejected the realistic advice offered by the Rhett Butler character and never understood the risk that they were taking in going to war.

Song of the South
The 1946 Disney film Song of the South is the first to have combined live actors with animated shorts. In the framing story, the actor James Baskett played Uncle Remus, a former slave who apparently is full of joy and wisdom despite having lived part of his life in slavery. There is a common misconception that the story takes place in the antebellum period and that the African-American characters are slaves. One critic said, "Like other similar films of the period also dealing with the antebellum South, the slaves in the film are all good-natured, subservient, annoyingly cheerful, content and always willing to help a white person in need with some valuable life lesson along the way. In fact, they're never called slaves, but they come off more like neighborly workers lending a helping hand for some kind, benevolent plantation owners." Disney has never released it on DVD and the film has been withheld from Disney+.  It was released on VHS in the United Kingdom several times, most recently in 2000.

Gods and Generals
The 2003 Civil War film Gods and Generals, based on Jeff Shaara's 1996 novel, is widely viewed as championing the Lost Cause ideology with a presentation favorable to the Confederacy and lionizing Generals Jackson and Lee.

Writing in the Journal of American History, the historian Steven E. Woodworth derided the movie as a modern-day telling of Lost Cause mythology. Woodworth called the movie "the most pro-Confederate film since Birth of a Nation, a veritable celluloid celebration of slavery and treason". He summed up his reasons for disliking the movie:

Woodworth criticized the portrayal of slaves as being "generally happy" with their condition. He also criticized the relative lack of attention given to the motivations of Union soldiers fighting in the war. He excoriates the film for allegedly implying, in agreement with Lost Cause mythology, that the South was more "sincerely Christian". Woodworth concluded that the film through "judicial omission" presents "a distorted view of the Civil War".

The historian William B. Feis similarly criticized the director's decision "to champion the more simplistic-and sanitized-interpretations found in post-war 'Lost Cause' mythology". The film critic Roger Ebert described the movie as "a Civil War movie that Trent Lott might enjoy" and said of its Lost Cause themes, "If World War II were handled this way, there'd be hell to pay."

The consensus of film critics of the movie was that it had a "pro-Confederate slant".

Later use
Professor Gallagher contended that Douglas Southall Freeman's definitive four-volume biography of Lee, published in 1934, "cemented in American letters an interpretation of Lee very close to Early's utterly heroic figure". In that work, Lee's subordinates were primarily to blame for errors that lost battles. While Longstreet was the most common target of such attacks, others came under fire as well. Richard Ewell, Jubal Early, J. E. B. Stuart, A. P. Hill, George Pickett, and many others were frequently attacked and blamed by Southerners in an attempt to deflect criticism from Lee.

Hudson Strode wrote a widely read scholarly three-volume biography of Confederate President Jefferson Davis, published in the 1950s and 1960s. A leading scholarly journal that reviewed it stressed Strode's political biases:
His [Jefferson Davis's] enemies are devils, and his friends, like Davis himself, have been canonized. Strode not only attempts to sanctify Davis but also the Confederate point of view, and this study should be relished by those vigorously sympathetic with the Lost Cause.

One Dallas newspaper editorial in 2018 referred to the Texas Civil War Museum as "a lovely bit of 'Lost Cause' propaganda".

While not limited to the American South specifically, the Stop the Steal movement in the wake of the 2020 US presidential election has been interpreted as a reemergence of the Lost Cause idea and a manifestation of white backlash.

Contemporary historians
Contemporary historians overwhelmingly agree that secession was motivated by slavery. There were numerous causes for secession, but preservation and expansion of slavery was easily the most important of them. The confusion may come from blending the causes of secession with the causes of the war, which were separate but related issues.

According to the historian Kenneth M. Stampp, each side supported states' rights or stronger federal power only when it was convenient for it to do so. Stampp cited Confederate Vice President Alexander Stephens as an example of a Southern leader who, when the war began, said that slavery was the "cornerstone of the Confederacy", but after the defeat of the Confederacy said, in A Constitutional View of the Late War Between the States, that the war had  been not about slavery but about states' rights. Stephens became one of the most ardent defenders of the Lost Cause myth.

Similarly, the historian William C. Davis explained the Confederate Constitution's protection of slavery at the national level:

To the old Union they had said that the Federal power had no authority to interfere with slavery issues in a state. To their new nation they would declare that the state had no power to interfere with a federal protection of slavery. Of all the many testimonials to the fact that slavery, and not states' rights, really lay at the heart of their movement, this was the most eloquent of all.

Davis further noted, "Causes and effects of the war have been manipulated and mythologized to suit political and social agendas, past and present." The historian David Blight said that "its use of white supremacy as both means and ends" has been a key characteristic of the Lost Cause. The historian Allan Nolan wrote:

[T]he Lost Cause legacy to history is a caricature of the truth. The caricature wholly misrepresents and distorts the facts of the matter. Surely it is time to start again in our understanding of this decisive element of our past and to do so from the premises of history unadulterated by the distortions, falsehoods, and romantic sentimentality of the Myth of the Lost Cause.

The historian William C. Davis labeled many of the myths that surround the war "frivolous" and these myths include attempts to rename the war by "Confederate partisans." He also stated that names such as "War of Northern Aggression" and "War Between the States" (the latter being an expression coined by Alexander Stephens) were just attempts to deny the fact that the American Civil War was an actual civil war.

The historian A. Cash Koeniger argues that Gary Gallagher has mischaracterized films that depict the Lost Cause. He wrote that Gallagher

concedes that "Lost Cause themes" (with the important exception of minimizing the importance of slavery) are based on historical truths (p. 46). Confederate soldiers were often outnumbered, ragged, and hungry; southern civilians did endure much material deprivation and a disproportionate amount of bereavement; U.S. forces did wreck [sic] havoc on southern infrastructure and private property and the like, yet whenever these points appear in films Gallagher considers them motifs "celebratory" of the Confederacy (p. 81).

See also

Places and events 
 List of Confederate monuments and memorials
 Blandford Church
 Confederate Memorial Day
 Confederate Memorial Hall
 Confederate Memorial Hall Museum

Nostalgia and pseudo-historical ideologies 
 Communist nostalgia – Eastern Europe and Russia
 Stab-in-the-back myth – German pseudo-historical explanation for losing WWI
 Sociological Francoism – Spain
 Myth of the clean Wehrmacht – post-WWII Germany

Other 
 Kappa Alpha Order
 Naming the American Civil War
 Solid South
 Southern Democrats
 White nationalism

References
Notes

Bibliography
 
 
 Barnhart, Terry A. (2011) Albert Taylor Bledsoe: Defender of the Old South and Architect of the Lost Cause. Baton Rouge, Louiisiana: Louisiana State University Press. 
 
 Boccardi, Megan B. (2011) "Remembering in black and white: Missouri women's memorial work 1860–1910" (PhD. Dissertation), Columbia, Missouri: University of Missouri—Columbia. pp. 231–57
 Coski, John M. (2005) The Confederate Battle Flag: America's Most Embattled Emblem. Cambridge, Massachusetts: Belknap Press. 
 Cox, Karen L. (2003) Dixie's Daughters: The United Daughters of the Confederacy and the Preservation of Confederate Culture. Gainesville, Florida: University Press of Florida. 
 
 Davis, William C. (2002) Look Away: A History of the Confederate States of America. New York: Free Press  
 
 
 
 Freeman, Douglas Southall (1939) The South to Posterity: An Introduction to the Writing of Confederate History. New York: Charles Scribner's Sons.
 Gallagher, Gary W. and Alan T. Nolan, editors (2000) The Myth of the Lost Cause and Civil War History. Bloomington, Indiana: Indiana University Press .
 Gallagher, Gary W. (1995) Jubal A. Early, the Lost Cause, and Civil War History: A Persistent Legacy (Frank L. Klement Lectures, No. 4). Milwaukee, Wisconsin: Marquette University Press. .
 Goldfield, David (2002) Still Fighting the Civil War. Baton Rouge, Louisiana: Louisiana State University Press. 
 Gulley, H. (1993) "Women and the Lost Cause: Preserving a Confederate Identity in the American Deep South" Journal of Historical Geography 19.2: 125
 
 
 
 Janney, Caroline E. (2009) "The Lost Cause." Encyclopedia Virginia Virginia Foundation for the Humanities
 
 Osterweis, Rollin G. (1973) The Myth of the Lost Cause, 1865–1900 Hamden, Connecticut: Archon Books 
 Reardon, Carol, Pickett's Charge in History and Memory, University of North Carolina Press, 1997, .
 
 
 Stampp, Kenneth (1991) The Causes of the Civil War (3rd rev. edition) New York: Touchstone Books 
 Ulbrich, David, "Lost Cause" (2000) in Heidler, David S. and Heidler, Jeanne T., eds.  Encyclopedia of the American Civil War: A Political, Social, and Military History. New York: W. W. Norton & Company .
 Wilson, Charles Reagan, (1980) Baptized in Blood: The Religion of the Lost Cause, 1865–1920. Athens, Georgia: University of Georgia Press .
 Wilson, Charles Reagan (1997) "The Lost Cause Myth in the New South Era" in Gerster, Patrick and Cords, Nicholas, editors Myth America: A Historical Anthology, Volume II. St. James, New York: Brandywine Press. 

Further reading
Primary
 
 
 
 

Secondary and Tertiary

External links
 Whose Heritage? Public Symbols of the Confederacy, map by SPLC, showing places dedicated to the memorial of Confederates 
 Interview with historian Adam Domby about The False Cause: Fraud, Fabrication, and White Supremacy in Confederate Memory on Half Hour of Heterodoxy
 Origins of the Lost Cause, an academic panel at Reconstruction and the Legacy of the War the 2016 summer conference hosted by the Civil War Institute. C-SPAN.

 
Historiography of the American Civil War
Aftermath of the American Civil War
Cultural history of the American Civil War
History of the Southern United States
Historical negationism
Social history of the United States
Politics of the Southern United States
Propaganda legends
Pseudohistory
Reconstruction Era
Riots and civil disorder in South Carolina
Riots and civil disorder during the Reconstruction Era
Sons of Confederate Veterans
White supremacy in the United States
United Daughters of the Confederacy
Nostalgia in the United States